Banca Popolare di Mantova S.p.A. was an Italian cooperative bank based in Mantua, Lombardy. Including the headquarters, the bank operated at 17 locations.

History
The company was relocated from Pescopagano, Basilicata (as Banca Operaia di Pescopagano) to Mantua in 2000, which the branches of the original bank were acquired by Banca Bipielle Centrosud, a subsidiary of Banca Popolare di Lodi  (BPL Group). In 2001 the bank increased to have 4 branches. The year BPL owned 57.41% shares directly. In 2002 Bipielle Retail became the sub-holding company for 56.35%, as well as one more branch was opened. In 2003 Reti Bancarie absorbed Bipielle Retail to become another sub-holding company. In 2004 BPL further disinvested the company to 52.32%, despite 2 more branches being opened. In 2005 BP Mantova had 8 branches. In 2006 Reti Bancarie was absorbed into BPL, which hold 55.01% shares of BP Mantova. In 2007 due to the merger of Banco Popolare di Verona e Novara and BPL, Banco Popolare S.C. became the new holding company of the bank. However, due to the branch network overlapped with Banca Popolare di Verona – S.Geminiano e S.Prospero, Banco Popolare sold 56.99% shares of BP Mantova to Banca Popolare di Milano for €32.49 million in 2008.

In 2009, BPM held 57.05% shares, with Omniaholding S.p.A. as the second largest shareholders of 13.8979%, which was the holding company for the Roberto Colaninno family.

Follow the merger of parent company Banca Popolare di Milano S.c. a r.l. with Banco Popolare S.C. to form Banco BPM S.p.A., the branches of Banca Popolare di Milano were injected to Banca Popolare di Mantova in order to keep the branches as a subsidiary (as Banca Popolare di Milano S.p.A.) instead of division.

See also

 Banca Agricola Mantovana

References

External links
 

Banks established in 2000
Banks disestablished in 2016
2016 disestablishments in Italy
Companies based in Mantua
Banca Popolare di Milano
Defunct cooperative banks of Italy
Re-established companies
Italian companies established in 2000